WPLT may refer to:

 WPLT (FM), a radio station (106.3 FM) licensed to serve Sarona, Wisconsin, United States
 WDVD, a radio station (96.3 FM) licensed to serve Detroit, Michigan, United States, assigned call sign WPLT from June 1997 to March 2001
 WQKE, a defunct radio station (93.9 FM) formerly licensed to serve Plattsburgh, New York, United States, assigned call sign WPLT from 1971 until June 1997